Pristimantis mars is a species of frog in the family Strabomantidae.
It is endemic to the Risaralda Department of Colombia, in the Cordillera Occidental.
Its natural habitat is tropical moist montane forests.
It is threatened by habitat loss.

References

mars
Amphibians of Colombia
Endemic fauna of Colombia
Amphibians described in 1996
Taxonomy articles created by Polbot